The 2001 Barangay Ginebra Kings season was the 23rd season of the franchise in the Philippine Basketball Association (PBA).

Draft picks

Finals stint
Barangay Ginebra Kings makes a return trip to the PBA championship since 1997, the first time post-Sonny Jaworski era, playing against sister team San Miguel Beermen in the 2001 All-Filipino Cup finals. The Kings made it by winning twice over Purefoods Tender Juicy Hotdogs during the quarterfinal round with both victories by one-point margin. The Kings won their best-of-five semifinal series against Shell Turbo Chargers, three games to two. Ginebra center Jun Limpot played in his first finals appearance after eight years while Vergel Meneses is back in the PBA finals since his Sunkist days in 1995. The Barangay Ginebra Kings lost to San Miguel Beermen in six games.

Awards
Mark Caguioa was named the season's Rookie of the Year (ROY).

Roster

 Team Manager: Ira Maniquis

Elimination round

Games won

References

Barangay Ginebra San Miguel seasons
Barangay